Ann Scott may refer to:

 Ann Scott (French novelist) (born 1965)
 Ann Scott (British author) (born 1950), British feminist author
 Ann Scott (singer), Irish singer-songwriter
 Ann London Scott (1929–1975), American feminist
 Ann Scott, former First Lady of Florida

See also 
 Anne Scott (disambiguation)
 Scott (surname)